"Samb-Adagio" is a song by Danish percussion duo Safri Duo. It was released in June 2001 as the second single from their first mainstream studio album, Episode II. The single reached number nine on the Danish Singles Chart. Outside Denmark, the single reached number three in Spain and the top 20 in Belgium (Flanders), Finland, and Germany. It also reached the top 30 in the Netherlands, Sweden, and Switzerland.

Track listings

Credits and personnel
 Writers: Morten Friis, Uffe Savery, Michael Parsberg
 Produced and arranged by Safri Duo, Michael Parsberg
 Recorded in The Safri Studio, Copenhagen, Denmark
 Engineer: Johnny Stage

Charts

Weekly charts

References

External links
 ""Samb-Adagio" at Discogs

2001 songs
Safri Duo songs
Song recordings produced by Michael Parsberg
Universal Music Group singles